Carson Fagan (born 1 May 1982) is a Caymanian international football player who plays as a midfielder for East End United in the Cayman Islands League.

Fagan made his international debut for the Cayman Islands against Cuba in the 4–0 World Cup 2002 qualifier on 5 March 2000.

He had a trial with English club Bolton Wanderers in March 2000 along with fellow Cayman Island players Frederick Wilks and Kevin James but after a reserve team appearance against Everton was not given a contract.

International career

References

External links

1982 births
Living people
Cayman Islands international footballers
Caymanian footballers
George Town SC players
Association football midfielders